Samy Elmaghribi (born in 1922 as Salomon Amzallag, in Safi, died on March 9, 2008) was a Jewish-Moroccan musician. He lived in Paris and Montreal. Originally from Safi, his family moved to Rabat in 1926. He started to familiarize himself with Arab-Andalusian music and taught himself to play the oud. He later perfected his technique by attending the "Conservatoire de Musique" in Casablanca and by following some of the most revered Algerian masters of Andalusian music. When he was 20 years old, he decided to quit his position as a sales manager to devote himself entirely to music. Having access to the Moroccan palace, he was one of the most preferred singers of Mohammed V. He left Morocco for Montreal in the 1960s, where he led a synagogue. He also settled in Israel, later to return to Canada. He died on March 9, 2008, in Montreal.
Chaimae Bouazzaoui, the first Moroccan woman Diplomat in Israel interviewed Samy Elmaghribi's daughter, in 2015, on the occasion of the launch of the Samy Elmaghribi Foundation   in Canada, describing her father as "the Moroccan Aznavour".

Discography
Contributing artist
 The Rough Guide to the Music of Morocco (2012, World Music Network)

References 

1922 births
People from Safi, Morocco
20th-century Moroccan male singers
20th-century Moroccan Jews
2008 deaths
Moroccan expatriates in France
Moroccan expatriates in Israel
Moroccan expatriates in Canada